The 2020 Philadelphia Union season was the club's eleventh season in Major League Soccer, the top flight of American soccer. The team was managed by Jim Curtin, his seventh season with the club. The Union's season began on February 29, 2020, and was scheduled on end in October or November 2020, depending on their regular season performance. On March 12, 2020, MLS suspended the season due to the ongoing COVID-19 pandemic. Originally planned to be a 30-day suspension, the league remained suspended until July 9, 2020, when competition resumed with the MLS is Back Tournament. The tournament ran through August 11, 2020, with the remainder of the season, under a truncated format, continued through November 8, 2020.

The 2020 season saw Philadelphia win their first major trophy in club history, by capturing the Supporters' Shield for the best regular season record. Philadelphia finished 14–4–5, averaging 2.04 points per game. Outside of MLS regular season play, the club was eliminated in the Conference Quarterfinals of the 2020 MLS Cup Playoffs, losing to New England Revolution. In the MLS is Back Tournament, Philadelphia reached the semifinals of the tournament before losing to eventual champions, Portland Timbers. The Union were also slated to participate the 2020 Leagues Cup and the 2020 U.S. Open Cup, but both competitions though were cancelled due to the COVID-19 pandemic.

2020 roster

Transfers

In

Out

Loan out

Staff

Competitions

Preseason

MLS

League tables

Eastern Conference

Overall

Match results
Only matches numbered in the left column apply to the season standings

MLS Cup Playoffs

MLS is Back Tournament

Group stage

Group A standings

Group A results

Knockout round

U.S. Open Cup 

Due to their final standings for the 2019 season, the Union were scheduled to enter the competition in the Fourth Round, to be played May 19–20. The ongoing coronavirus pandemic, however, forced the U.S. Soccer Federation to cancel the tournament on August 17, 2020.

Honors and awards

References

Philadelphia Union
Philadelphia Union seasons
Philadelphia Union
Philadelphia Union
2020